The Hàm Luông River is a branch of Mekong River in the Mekong Delta region, Vietnam. It flows for  through Bến Tre Province. It is the border of Châu Thành, Bến Tre, Giồng Trôm and Ba Tri, and Chợ Lách, Mỏ Cày Nam, Mỏ Cày Bắc and Thạnh Phú.

See also
Ham Luong Bridge

References

Rivers of Bến Tre province
Rivers of Vietnam